Lassa may refer to:

Biology and medicine
Asthena lassa, a moth in the family Geometridae
Lassa fever, a type of viral hemorrhagic fever caused by the Lassa virus
Lassa hastata (Pavonia hastata), a shrub in the family Malvaceae
Lassa virus (LASV), the arenavirus that causes Lassa hemorrhagic fever, named after Lassa in Borno State, Nigeria
Saphenista lassa, a species of moth of the family Tortricidae

Places
Lassa, a town in Borno State, Nigeria
Lassa, Lebanon, a municipality in the Byblos District of Mount Lebanon Governorate, Lebanon
Lassa, Togo, a city in the Kara Region of Togo
Lhasa,  Tibet, China of which Lassa is an alternate spelling

Other uses
Lassa Oppenheim, a German jurist and author of International Law: A Treatise
Lassa (surname), a surname (including a list of people with the name)
FC Barcelona Lassa, a Spanish professional basketball club

See also
Lasa (disambiguation)
Lassas, a surname (including a list of people with the name)
Lhasa (disambiguation)